Grand Isle is a census-designated place (CDP) and the primary village in the town of Grand Isle, Aroostook County, Maine, United States. It is in the northwest corner of the town, situated on high ground overlooking the St. John River, which forms the Canada–United States border. The Canadian province of New Brunswick is to the northeast across the river.

U.S. Route 1 passes through Grand Isle, leading northwest  to Madawaska and southeast  to Van Buren.

Grand Isle was first listed as a CDP prior to the 2020 census.

Demographics

References 

Census-designated places in Aroostook County, Maine
Census-designated places in Maine